Thomas Gilbert White (July 18, 1877 – February 17, 1939) was an American painter, now best remembered for his murals. His brothers Stewart Edward White and Roderick White also achieved acclaim, as author and violinist, respectively.

White was born in Grand Haven, Michigan, and died in Paris. He studied at Columbia University and the Art Students League of New York, and at the Académie Julian and the Académie des Beaux-Arts in Paris with James McNeill Whistler. His work graces the state capitols of Kentucky, Oklahoma, and Utah; the County Courthouse in New Haven, Connecticut and Gadsden, Alabama; and the Pan American Union Building in Washington, D.C. He received numerous awards, among them the Commander de la Legion d’Honneur, Officier de l’Académie française, and the Order of the Purple Heart.

References 

 GSA biography  (no copyright, since a work of the United States Government)
 "Gilbert White is Claimed by Death", obituary, The Evening Independent, St. Petersburg, Florida, February 17, 1939.

Notes 

American muralists
Art Students League of New York alumni
1877 births
1939 deaths
19th-century American painters
19th-century American male artists
American male painters
20th-century American painters
American alumni of the École des Beaux-Arts
Académie Julian alumni
Commandeurs of the Légion d'honneur
People from Grand Haven, Michigan
Painters from Michigan
American expatriates in France
Columbia College (New York) alumni
20th-century American male artists